José Antonio Caro Martínez (born 8 March 1993) is a Spanish professional footballer who plays as a central defender for Linares Deportivo.

Club career
Born in Estepa, Province of Seville, Caro played youth football for local Real Betis, and made his senior debut with the B team in the 2011–12 season, playing one game in the Segunda División B.

Caro appeared in his first competitive match with the Andalusians' main squad on 3 November 2013, coming on as a substitute for Damien Perquis in the 55th minute of a 3–2 La Liga away loss against Málaga CF. He was handed his first start four days later, featuring the entire 1–0 win at Vitória S.C. in the group stage of the UEFA Europa League.

On 21 August 2015, Caro was loaned to Segunda División club Elche CF in a season-long deal. On 1 July of the following year, he terminated his contract with Betis and signed a two-year deal with Córdoba CF hours later. He scored his first goal as a professional on 8 October 2016, closing a 1–1 away draw with CD Numancia.

On 27 July 2018, free agent Caro signed a two-year contract with Albacete Balompié, still in the second division. He made 17 appearances in his debut campaign to help his side finish fourth, netting in the 3–0 home victory over Córdoba on 2 September.

Caro moved abroad for the first time in September 2020, joining NK Osijek of the Croatian First Football League on a three-year deal. He returned to Spain and its third tier in the 2022 January transfer window, however, with UCAM Murcia CF.

References

External links

Beticopedia profile 

1993 births
Living people
People from Sierra Sur (Seville)
Sportspeople from the Province of Seville
Spanish footballers
Footballers from Andalusia
Association football defenders
La Liga players
Segunda División players
Segunda División B players
Tercera División players
Primera Federación players
Betis Deportivo Balompié footballers
Real Betis players
Elche CF players
Córdoba CF players
Albacete Balompié players
UCAM Murcia CF players
Linares Deportivo footballers
Croatian Football League players
NK Osijek players
Spanish expatriate footballers
Expatriate footballers in Croatia
Spanish expatriate sportspeople in Croatia